Barabani is a village, in the Barabani CD block in the Asansol Sadar subdivision of the Paschim Bardhaman district in the state of West Bengal, India.

Geography

Urbanisation
As per the 2011 census, 83.33% of the population of Asansol Sadar subdivision was urban and 16.67% was rural. In 2015, the municipal areas of Kulti, Raniganj and Jamuria were included within the jurisdiction of Asansol Municipal Corporation. Asansol Sadar subdivision has 26 (+1 partly) Census Towns.(partly presented in the map alongside; all places marked on the map are linked in the full-screen map).

Civic administration

Police station
Barabani police station has jurisdiction over Barabani CD block. The area covered is 158.87 km2 and the population covered is 110,361.

Demographics
According to the  2011 Census of India Barabani had a total population of 2,330 of which 1,233 (53%) were males and 1,097 (47%) were females. Population in the age range 0–6 years was 303. The total number of literate persons in Barabani was 1,204 (59.40% of the population over 6 years).

*For language details see Barabani (community development block)#Language and religion

Transport
There is a station on the Andal-Jamuria-Sitarampur branch line.

References

Villages in Paschim Bardhaman district